Lewis Jefferson Mays (born June 8, 1965) is an American actor. He is the recipient of numerous accolades, including a Tony Award, a Helen Hayes Award, a Lucille Lortel Award, two Drama Desk Awards, two Outer Critics Circle Awards and three Obie Awards.

Life and career
Mays was raised in Clinton, Connecticut, with his parents, a naval intelligence officer and a children's librarian, and his siblings. Mays graduated from Yale College, where he received a Bachelor of Arts degree, and the University of California, San Diego, where he earned a Master of Fine Arts from the graduate acting program. He appeared at La Jolla Playhouse, Long Wharf Theatre, the Williamstown Theatre Festival, and Playwrights Horizons.

Mays appeared on Broadway in I Am My Own Wife, a Pulitzer Prize-winning play by Doug Wright, from November 2003 (previews) to October 31, 2004. He had appeared in the play Off-Broadway at Playwrights Horizons in May 2003, and at the La Jolla Playhouse in July 2001. Mays won the 2004 Tony Award for Best Performance by a Leading Actor in a Play, the 2004 Drama Desk Award for Outstanding One-Person Show, an Obie Award, and a 2004 Theatre World Award for his solo performance. He also won the 2007 Helpmann Award for Best Male Actor in a Play for seasons of I Am My Own Wife in Australia in 2006.

Mays starred in two Broadway revivals in 2007. He appeared as Henry Higgins in Pygmalion, in which he won critical praise. The TheaterMania reviewer called him "pitch-perfect", and the production an "excellent revival". He appeared in a revival of Journey's End in February to June 2007, in which he starred as Private Mason. Ben Brantley, in The New York Times, called the production "acutely staged and acted." The TheaterMania reviewer wrote: "Mays is a reliable, obliging Mason."

In August 2009, Mays appeared at the Williamstown Theatre Festival in Quartermaine's Terms by Simon Grey.

Mays starred in the 2013 Broadway musical A Gentleman's Guide to Love and Murder, in which he played nine roles. He performed in the musical from October 2013 (previews) until closing on January 17, 2016. He won the Outer Critics Circle Award for Outstanding Actor in a Musical. He was nominated for the Tony Award for Best Performance by a Leading Actor in a Musical and tied for the Drama Desk Award for Outstanding Actor in a Musical (with Neil Patrick Harris). Mays played Terje Rød-Larsen in the Broadway play Oslo, for which he received a Tony Award for Best Actor in a Play nomination. Mays played Mayor George Shinn in the 2022 Broadway revival of The Music Man.

Mays also narrates audiobooks, including The Expanse series and The Invention of Sound by Chuck Palahniuk.

Mays has appeared in several television programs as well; he notably appeared in several episodes of Law & Order: Special Victims Unit as cross-dressing murderer Carl Rudnick, and as Black Dahlia suspect George Hodel in the Turner Network Television miniseries I Am the Night. His television credits include Unbreakable Kimmy Schmidt, The Good Wife, Nurse Jackie and The Americans.

Personal life
Mays is married to Australian actress Susan Lyons.

Filmography

Film

Television

Theatre

Awards

References

External links
 
 
 Jefferson Mays biography, iammyownwife.com; accessed July 11, 2015.

1965 births
American male film actors
American male stage actors
Drama Desk Award winners
Helpmann Award winners
Living people
Male actors from Connecticut
Theatre World Award winners
Tony Award winners
University of California, San Diego alumni
Yale College alumni
20th-century American male actors
21st-century American male actors
Place of birth missing (living people)
Audiobook narrators